Italian motor merchant SS Rosanna, built in 1937, in Zaandam, in the Netherlands. Scuttled on 9 February 1941, in the Gulf of Sidra by Italians to avoid capture by British troops.

References

1937 ships
Merchant ships of Italy
Scuttled vessels
Maritime incidents in February 1941
World War II shipwrecks in the Mediterranean Sea